John Murray, 1st Duke of Atholl, KT, PC (24 February 166014 November 1724) was a Scottish nobleman,  politician, and soldier. He served in numerous positions during his life, and fought in the Glorious Revolution for William III and Mary II.

Early life and family
Murray was born in 1660 at Knowsley Hall, Lancashire, England to John Murray, 1st Marquess of Atholl and his wife, the former Lady Amelia Sophia Stanley. Murray's maternal grandparents were the 7th Earl of Derby and the Countess of Derby. He was the first of twelve children and, as opposed to continual speculation, he was not blind in any of his eyes at any time in his life. Lord Murray matriculated from St. Andrews University in 1676. He was married twice and was the father of nineteen children.

Later life and career
He was created 1st Earl of Tullibardine by William III of England in 1696 and was created the 1st Duke of Atholl by Queen Anne in 1703.
 
Lord Murray was a supporter of King William III during the Glorious Revolution, taking the oath of loyalty in September 1689, but was unable to prevent some of his clan from joining Lord Dundee under the command of his father's baillie, Stewart of Ballechin. Lord Murray laid siege to his family's ancestral home, Blair Castle, which Ballechin had fortified and held for King James VII/II but ended the siege just days prior to the Battle of Killiecrankie.

In 1683 he married Katherine Hamilton, daughter of Anne Hamilton, 3rd Duchess of Hamilton and her husband William Douglas, the Duke of Hamilton, with whom he had six daughters and seven sons; only six of his children survived into adulthood.

In 1693 he was appointed as one of the commissioners to the inquiry into the massacre of Glencoe. In 1695, Lord Murray was made Sheriff of Perth. In 1696 the earldom of Tullibardine was created for him, from whence he was known as the Earl of Tullibardine. Also in 1696, he became Secretary of State, and from 1696 to 1698 was Lord High Commissioner to the Parliament of Scotland. With the accession of Queen Anne in 1702, he was made a Privy Councillor, and in 1703 became Keeper of the Privy Seal of Scotland. The same year he succeeded his father as 2nd Marquess of Atholl, and in June 1703 he was created Duke of Atholl, Marquess of Tullibardine, Earl of Strathtay and Strathardle, Viscount of Balquhidder, Glenalmond and Glenlyon, and Lord Murray, Balvenie and Gask upon the death of his father.

In 1704, Murray succeeded his father as a Knight of the Thistle. In 1704 an unsuccessful attempt was made by Lord Lovat, who used the Duke of Queensberry as a tool to implicate him in a Jacobite plot against Queen Anne. The intrigue was disclosed by Robert Ferguson, and Atholl sent a memorial to the Queen on the subject, which resulted in Queensberry's downfall. But the affair had a damaging effect on Murray's career, and he was deprived of office in October 1704. He subsequently became a strong antagonist of the government, and of the Hanoverian succession. He vehemently opposed Union during the years 1705–1707, and entered into a project which would have resisted the crown by force by holding Stirling Castle with the aid of the Cameronians but this plan was never followed. After the vote for Union,  he accepted compensation of £1,000 for back pay from services owed him (although in Lord Polwarth's memoirs the monies were not a 'bribe' as has been suggested by the Jacobite, Sir George Lockhart of Carnwath, but remuneration owed him since 1698 for service to the crown). On the occasion, however, of the planned invasion of 1708 he took no part, on account of illness, and was placed under arrest at Blair Castle.

With the downfall of the Whigs and the advent of the Tories to power, Murray returned to favour and to office. He was chosen a representative peer in the House of Lords in 1710 and in 1712 was restored to his position as High Commissioner and Keeper of the Privy Seal.

With the accession of King George I he was again dismissed from office. Three of his sons joined the Jacobites in the rebellion of 1715, including his eldest living son, William, Lord Tullibardine. who was subsequently attainted and removed from succession to the title, but Murray himself remained loyal to the Government.  In June 1717 he apprehended Rob Roy MacGregor, who, however, succeeded in escaping.

Atholl died in 1724, and was succeeded by his second surviving son James, Marquess of Tullibardine.

Children
By his first wife Lady Katherine, daughter of William Douglas-Hamilton, 3rd Duke of Hamilton and Anne Hamilton, 3rd Duchess of Hamilton, he had the following thirteen children: 

 John Murray, Marquess of Tullibardine (6 May 168411 September 1709) Killed during the Battle of Malplaquet
 Lady Anne Murray (21 May 168520 July 1686)
 Lady Mary Murray (28 September 16866 January 1689)
 William Murray, Marquess of Tullibardine (14 April 16899 July 1746) (attainted and removed from the succession)
 James Murray, 2nd Duke of Atholl (28 September 16908 January 1764)
 Lord Charles Murray (24 September 169128 August 1720)
 Lady Katherine Murray (28 October 16925 November 1692)
 Lord George Murray (23 August 169325 August 1693)
 Lord George Murray (4 October 169411 October 1760)

 Lady Susan Murray (15 April 169922 June 1725) (married William Gordon, 2nd Earl of Aberdeen)
 Lady Katherine Murray (25 April 17021710)
 Lord Basil Murray (29 December 1704February 1712). Several children in the Dunkeld area were named "Basil" after him.

By his second wife Lady Mary Ross, daughter of William Ross, 12th Lord Ross and Lady Agnes Wilkie. They had the following eight children: 
 Lord John Murray (14 April 171126 May 1787)
 Lord Mungo Murray (August 1712June 1714)
 Lord Edward Murray (9 June 17142 February 1737)
 Lord Frederick Murray (8 January 1716April 1743)
 Lady Wilhelmina Caroline Murray (28 May 1718May 1720)
 Lady Mary Murray (3 March 172029 December 1795)
 Lady Amelia Anne Murray (20 April 172126 April 1721)

See also
Duke of Atholl

Notes

References
 

For details of the Duke's children, http://www.stirnet.com/HTML/genie/british/mm4fz/murray03.htm

1660 births
1724 deaths
Alumni of the University of St Andrews
Chancellors of the University of St Andrews
101
Knights of the Thistle
Members of the Privy Council of Great Britain
Scottish representative peers
Peers of Scotland created by William II
Lords High Commissioner to the General Assembly of the Church of Scotland
John
Members of the Privy Council of Scotland
Lords High Commissioner to the Parliament of Scotland
17th-century Scottish people
18th-century Scottish people
People of Byzantine descent
Senators of the College of Justice
Extraordinary Lords of Session